Diego Causero (born 13 January 1940) is an Italian prelate of the Catholic Church who spent his career in the diplomatic service of the Holy See. From 1992 to 2015, he served as the head of the Vatican's diplomatic mission in several African and European countries.

Biography
Diego Causero was born in Moimacco in the Province of Udine, Italy, on 13 January 1940. He studying at the seminary in Udine, he continued his studies at the Pontifical Gregorian University from 1959 to 1964 and was ordained a priest of the Archdiocese of Udine on 7 April 1963.

He earned a doctorate in theology in 1966, with a specialty in liturgy, at the Pontifical Atheneum of St. Anselm.

To prepare for a career as a diplomat he entered the Pontifical Ecclesiastical Academy in 1969. He entered the diplomatic service of the Holy See in 1973. His assignments included stints in Nigeria, Spain, Syria, Australia, as the Holy See's representative to the United Nations in Geneva, and in Albania.

On 15 December 1992, Pope John Paul II named him a titular archbishop and Apostolic Nuncio to Chad. He received his episcopal consecration on 6 January 1993 from Pope John Paul. On 1 February 1993 he was named Apostolic Nuncio to the Central African Republic and the Republic of the Congo as well.

On 31 March 1999, Pope John Paul appointed him Apostolic Nuncio to Syria.

On 10 January 2004, Pope John Paul named him Apostolic Nuncio to the Czech Republic.

On 28 May 2011, Pope Benedict XVI appointed him Apostolic Nuncio to Switzerland and Liechtenstein.

He retired on 5 September 2015 upon the appointment of Thomas Gullickson as his successor in Switzerland and Liechtenstein.

Notes

See also
 List of heads of the diplomatic missions of the Holy See

References

External links

 Catholic Hierarchy: Archbishop Diego Causero 

1942 births
Living people
Pontifical Gregorian University alumni
Pontifical Ecclesiastical Academy alumni
Apostolic Nuncios to Chad
Apostolic Nuncios to the Central African Republic
Apostolic Nuncios to the Republic of the Congo
Apostolic Nuncios to Syria
Apostolic Nuncios to the Czech Republic
Apostolic Nuncios to Switzerland
Apostolic Nuncios to Liechtenstein
People from the Province of Udine